Fundoaia may refer to several places in Romania:

 Fundoaia, a village in Huruiești Commune, Bacău County
 Fundoaia, a village in Sărmaș Commune, Harghita County
 Fundoaia, a village in Gurghiu Commune, Mureș County

See also 
 Fundeni (disambiguation)
 Fundătura (disambiguation)
 Fundata